François Salque is a contemporary French classical cellist.

Biography 

He has played and recorded chamber music with Éric Le Sage, Alexandre Tharaud, Emmanuel Pahud and Vincent Peirani. Salque also played in the Ysaÿe Quartet from 2000 to 2004, recording Fauré, Magnard, Haydn, Schumann, Boucourechliev, but also little known works or fragments by Beethoven, the piano quintet by César Franck (with Pascal Rogé) and the Clarinet Quintet by Mozart (with Michel Portal).

Nicolas Bacri, Karol Beffa, Thierry Escaich, Bruno Mantovani and Krystof Maratka have dedicated works to him.

Discography 
François Salque has recorded for the Æon, Alpha, Arion, Lyrinx, Naïve, RCA, Sony and Zig-Zag Territoires labels.

His numerous recordings have received awards from the Diapason d'or de l'année, "Chocs" of the Le Monde de la musique, "10" of Répertoire, Grand Prix du disque de l'Académie Charles-Cros, Victoires de la Musique.

 Beethoven, Cello Sonatas  - François Salque, cello ; Éric Le Sage, piano (March 2014, Sony)
 Fauré, Pelléas et Mélisande; Élégie; Mélodies; Wagner, Siegfried-Idyll - Orchestre de l'Opéra de Rouen Haute-Normandie, dir. Oswald Sallaberger; François Salque, cello (18-22 July 2011, Zig-Zag Territoires) 
 Saint-Saëns, The Carnival of the Animals ; Ladmirault, Les mémoires d'un âne - Claude Piéplu, narrator; Laurent Cabasso and Alexandre Tharaud pianos ; Philippe Bernold, flute; Ronald Van Spaendonck, clarinet; François Salque cello; Pierre Lénert, alto (1999, Arion) 
 Est (Bartók, Popper...) - François Salque, cello and Vincent Peirani, accordion (1-3 July 2010, Zig-Zag Territoires ZZT 110101) 
 Tanguillo (Astor Piazzolla, traditional) - François Salque, cello ; Vincent Peirani, accordion; Tomás Gubitsch, guitar (Zig-Zag Territoires ZZT322) 

 Videos
 Chopin et la mélodie, music lesson by Jean-François Zygel - direction Marie-Christine Gambart (2004, DVD Télescope audiovisuel/Naïve)

External links 
 Biography
 François Salque on Solea
 François Salque on France Musique
 Official website
 Biographie on conservatoiredeparis.fr
 François SALQUE - Pierre BOULEZ - Messagesquisse - on YouTube

Conservatoire de Paris alumni
Yale University alumni
Academic staff of the Conservatoire de Paris
French music educators
French classical cellists
Place of birth missing (living people)
Date of birth missing (living people)
Year of birth missing (living people)
Living people